Prospect Vale is a rural/residential locality in the local government areas (LGA) of Launceston (1%) and Meander Valley (99%) in the Launceston LGA region of Tasmania. The 2016 census recorded a population of 5067 for the state suburb of Prospect Vale.
It is a small suburb of Greater Launceston. Prospect Vale has a small shopping centre, Prospect Vale Marketplace, containing a Woolworths supermarket and a small industrial park lies within its boundaries. Sporting grounds include the St Patrick's Old Collegians Football Club Oval, who compete in the Northern Tasmania Football Association.

History 
Prospect Vale was gazetted as a locality in 1963.

The land was originally used by European settlers for cattle grazing and horse studs. The suburb was originally part of the adjacent suburb of Prospect, which was proclaimed in 1958.  Prospect primary school was the area's first school. This school is now known as Summerdale primary school, and is in the suburb of Summerhill. It contains two schools, the public Prospect High School and a private Catholic school, St. Patricks College.  
St Patrick's moved to the current site in the late 1950s, to where the Rising Sun Hotel, a 2-storey 12-room building had been first built. The current school buildings were built  for around 400 students.

Geography
Most of the boundaries are survey lines.

Road infrastructure 
National Route 1 (Bass Highway) runs through from south-east to south-west.

References

Bibliography

Localities of Meander Valley Council
Localities of City of Launceston
Suburbs of Launceston, Tasmania